Yukarıakın is a village in the central district (Karaman) of Karaman Province, Turkey. At   it is situated in the Taurus Mountains. The population of the village was 151  as of 2011. According to page of Karaman  news, the founders of the village were the members of a tribe named Ağaçeri and were Akıncı (irregular cavalry in the early years of the Ottoman Empire) . The original name of the village was Akın. But in the second half of the 19th century the village was split into two parts. Yukarıakın (literally "upper Akın") is the name of the western part. The main economic activity of Yukarıakın is agriculture.

References

Villages in Karaman Central District